The Burma Economic Development Corporation (BEDC), formerly the Defence Services Institute (DSI), was Burma's largest economic enterprise in the late 1950s. A state-run enterprise, it was established in May 1961, under the 1961 Burma Economic Development Corporation Act with the resumption of civilian rule, although it remained under military control. BEDC was nationalized on 20 October 1963, as part of the implementation of the Burmese Way to Socialism. At the time of nationalization, BEDC consisted of 42 separate firms, including Burma Beverage Co., Mandalay Brewery and Distillery, along with various chemical and paint, pharmaceutical, polyproducts, canning, shoes, garment manufacturers, book stores, housing and construction companies, fisheries, hardwood trading, hotel operators, and coal suppliers.

References

Financial services companies of Myanmar
Economic history of Myanmar
Financial services companies established in 1961
Government agencies established in 1961
1961 establishments in Burma
Economic development organizations